Chess competition at the 2021 Southeast Asian Games took place at Quảng Ninh Exhibition Palace of Urban Planning & Expo in Quảng Ninh, Vietnam from 10 to 21 May 2022.

Medal table

Medalists

Men's

Women's

References

External links
  
 Chess-Results entry of the tournament

2021 Southeast Asian Games events
2021
2022 in chess